"Up&Up" is a song by British rock band Coldplay from their seventh studio album, A Head Full of Dreams (2015). It was released as the third single of the record on 22 April 2016 by Parlophone. Background vocals in the song are provided by Beyoncé, Annabelle Wallis and Merry Clayton. A music video for the track, directed by Vania Heymann and Gal Muggia, was released on 16 May 2016.

Background
The song contains a chorus choir, which featured nearly all the artists who have collaborated with the group, including Beyoncé, Brian Eno and the children and guests of the four musicians. Guitarist and singer Noel Gallagher also contributed, performing the song's second guitar solo, which was omitted in the radio edit.

Music video

The band had released teasers on their social media accounts leading up to the video release. The music video directed by Vania Heymann and Gal Muggia was released on 16 May 2016. It has been described on the band's website as a "poignant, surrealist montage which alludes to contemporary issues." The video itself consists of over-layered visuals, and has the band playing the song in various landscapes and locations. One of the locations used is the Croatian mountain range of Biokovo, upon which Chris Martin appears to be seated.

Scenes and visual effects for the video were created by GloriaFX, a Ukraine-based visual effects company, headed by Anatolii Kuzmytskyi in Ukraine and by Max Colt in the US. Martin called it "one of the best videos ever made". Some scenes were cut from the video to make it shorter, including a man with a volcano in place of his head.

The band's lead singer, Chris Martin feels that this was one of best videos to be made. He says ''The video is – I'm going to drop the mic here and say – I think it's one of the best videos people have made. Even if you take the music away. That's my point," Coldplay's lead singer Chris Martin said. "It's made by these Israeli guys. These young guys. I can't believe that that's our video. If that was someone else's video, I'd be so jealous."

Reception
Billboard magazine's Chris Payne described the music video as "appropriately epic" with "a heady, shoot-for-the-stars type of statement". Carl Williott of Idolator, who was reserved towards the song itself, felt that its video "elevates it thanks to some artfully trippy visuals". MTV UK called the video "weird and wonderful in every respect" and "magical yet poignant".

The video received nominations for Best Direction and Best Visual Effects at the 2016 MTV Video Music Awards, winning the latter. The music video was also nominated for the Grammy Award for Best Music Video at the 59th Annual Grammy Awards.

Live performances
After giving fans a live performance preview of the album on 21 November 2015 in Los Angeles, Martin said: "This is kind of the song we've been waiting to write for 15 years." The band performed the song at the Super Bowl 50 halftime show held on 7 February 2016 in Santa Clara, California. They were joined by Bruno Mars and Beyoncé while singing the last verses. During the performance at Glastonbury Festival on 26 June 2016, the band were joined on stage by Chris Martin's children, Apple and Moses, who helped with the backing vocals.

The song was used to close the A Head Full of Dreams Tour. The live performance on 15 November 2017 in La Plata, Buenos Aires with an extended outro is included in Live in Buenos Aires.  Live recordings of the song have been released with the Butterfly Package as well as the Japanese exclusive live album ‘Love In Tokyo’ released in 2018.

Track listing

Credits and personnel
Credits are adapted from A Head Full of Dreams liner notes.

Coldplay
Guy Berryman – bass guitar, keyboards
Jonny Buckland – guitar, keyboards, backing vocals 
Will Champion – drums, backing vocals, programming
Chris Martin – lead vocals, piano, acoustic guitar

Additional musicians
Merry Clayton – vocals
Beyoncé Knowles – vocals
Annabelle Wallis – vocals
Blue Ivy Carter – vocals
Moses Martin – vocals, tambourine
Noel Gallagher – guitar solo

Charts

Weekly charts

Year-end charts

Certifications

Release history

References

External links
 Up&Up at Coldplay.com
  (Official video)

2016 singles
2015 songs
Coldplay songs
Song recordings produced by Rik Simpson
Song recordings produced by Stargate (record producers)
Songs written by Chris Martin
Songs written by Guy Berryman
Songs written by Jonny Buckland
Songs written by Will Champion